Nathan Lee Chasing His Horse, also known as Nathan Chasing Horse and Nathan Chases His Horse (born April 28, 1976) is a Native American actor. Born on the Rosebud Indian Reservation, he has spent most of his adult life in California, and currently resides in Las Vegas, Nevada. In January 2023, he was arrested on charges relating to multiple sex crimes against Indigenous girls.

Life and career
Chasing Horse portrayed the young Lakota character Smiles A Lot in Kevin Costner's 1990 movie Dances with Wolves. He has appeared in three TNT telefilms with First Nations actor Eric Schweig: The Broken Chain, Into the West, and Bury My Heart at Wounded Knee. He has given speaking engagements and workshops on spirituality, and developed a following in a variety of locations. 

He is the father of model Quannah Chasinghorse.

Chasing Horse gained a reputation among tribes across the United States and in Canada as a so-called medicine man who claimed to perform healing ceremonies and, police allege, used his position to abuse young Native American girls.

Legal issues
On July 6, 2015, after attempting to hold a Sun Dance ceremony in the area, Chasing Horse was banned from the Fort Peck Indian Reservation in Montana as a "safety threat", due to charges of "human trafficking, sexual abuse, drug dealing, and intimidation of tribal members".

Chasing Horse was arrested on January 31, 2023, by officers of the North Las Vegas Police Department and Las Vegas Metropolitan Police Department. Officers conducted a SWAT team raid on the house he shared with his five wives located in North Las Vegas. His arrest was the culmination of a months-long investigation that began after police received a tip in October 2022. According to a 50-page search warrant obtained by AP, Chasing Horse is believed to be the leader of a cult known as The Circle. Police report that they seized firearms, and that Chasing Horse was instructing his followers to “shoot it out” with law enforcement and, that if they failed, to take “suicide pills.” 

The Las Vegas police, as stated in the search warrant, have found evidence of at least six claims of sexual abuse, with one victim reporting being assaulted at the age of 13. The allegations against Chasing Horse span multiple states, including Montana, South Dakota, and Nevada where he has lived for the past 10 years, and date back to the early 2000s.

Filmography

References

External links
 

1976 births
Living people
American male film actors
Rosebud Sioux people
Native American male actors
Male Western (genre) film actors
American male child actors
Male actors from South Dakota
People from Rosebud Indian Reservation, South Dakota